Micrelenchus  sanguineus is a species of small sea snail, a marine gastropod mollusc in the family Trochidae, the top shells.

Subspecies
 Cantharidus sanguineus bakeri Fleming, 1948: synonym of Roseaplagis artizona A. Adams, 1853
 Cantharidus sanguineus var. elongatus Suter, 1897:synonym of Roseaplagis artizona A. Adams, 1853
 Cantharidus sanguineus cryptus (Powell, 1946): synonym of Micrelenchus sanguineus (Gray in Dieffenbach, 1843)

Description
The shell grows to a length of 9 mm, its diameter 7 mm.
The small,  imperforate shell has a conical shape. It is greenish or whitish with bloodred spots. Its sculpture consists of spiral cinguli with very narrow grooves between them, 5 to 6 on the penultimate and 10 to 14 on the body whorl. Sometimes these are slightly moniliform. The base contains about 5 cinguli. The colour of the shell is green, with oblique longitudinal rows of blood-red spots on the cinguli. The first three whorls are sometimes reddish or brownish with radiate white streaks, below the suture very often tessellated with white, brown, and red.

The acute spire is elevated conical, with sides slightly convex. The protoconch is conic with 1½ strongly convex smooth whorls, which are mostly pearly. The six whorls of the spire are flatly convex, the last angled at the periphery. The base of the shell is slightly convex. The sutures are impressed. The oblique aperture is iridescent and lirate within. The outer lip is solid, often strengthened within by a white
callosity. The arcuate columella is nearly vertical. The inner lip spreads a little over the umbilical tract, which is impressed and concave. The parietal wall contains a more or less thick callus.

Distribution
This marine species is endemic to New Zealand and occurs off North, South and Stewart Island.

References

 Powell, A.W.B. 1946. New species of New Zealand Mollusca from the South Island, Stewart Island and Chatham Islands. Records of the Auckland Institute and Museum 3: 137–144.
 Powell A. W. B., New Zealand Mollusca, William Collins Publishers Ltd, Auckland, New Zealand 1979 
 Marshall, B.A. 1998: The New Zealand Recent species of Cantharidus Montfort, 1810 and Micrelenchus Finlay, 1926 (Mollusca: Gastropoda: Trochidae). Molluscan Research 19: 107-156
 Spencer, H.G.; Marshall, B.A.; Maxwell, P.A.; Grant-Mackie, J.A.; Stilwell, J.D.; Willan, R.C.; Campbell, H.J.; Crampton, J.S.; Henderson, R.A.; Bradshaw, M.A.; Waterhouse, J.B.; Pojeta, J. Jr (2009). Phylum Mollusca: chitons, clams, tusk shells, snails, squids, and kin, in: Gordon, D.P. (Ed.) (2009). New Zealand inventory of biodiversity: 1. Kingdom Animalia: Radiata, Lophotrochozoa, Deuterostomia. pp. 161–254

External links
 Gray J.E. (1843). Catalogue of the species of Mollusca and their shells, which have hitherto been recorded as found at New Zealand, with the description of some lately discovered species. In: Dieffenbach, E.: Travels in New Zealand; with contributions to the geography, geology, botany, and natural history of that country, vol. 2: 228-265
 Transactions and Proceedings of the Royal Society of New Zealand 1868-1961, Micrelenchus sanguineus sanguineus
 Iredale T. (1915). A commentary on Suter's Manual of the New Zealand Mollusca. Transactions and Proceedings of the New Zealand Institute. 47: 417-497
 

sanguineus
Gastropods of New Zealand
Gastropods described in 1843